The Polar Conservation Organisation (PCO) is a non-profit organization. It was founded by Brendon Grunewald. In 2009, the group participated in a two-week expedition to the Canadian Arctic to assess the effects of climate change on the region and its inhabitants. They were accompanied by members of the Norwegian Polar Institute and cinematographer Ian McCarthy.

References

External links 
Official Website
Interview with Brendon Grunewald founder of Polar Conservation Organisation

Arctic research
Climate change organizations